Leukonychia (or leuconychia) is a medical term for white discoloration appearing on nails. It is derived from the Greek words leuko 'white' and onyx 'nail'. The most common cause is injury to the base of the nail (the matrix) where the nail is formed.

Types

Leukonychia totalis

This condition consists of a whitening of the entire nail and mostly likely occurs on all nails. Whitening of one, and only one, entire nail is not recognized as a symptom of Leukonychia totalis but as a likely result of mechanical trauma. Leukonychia totalis may be a clinical sign of hypoalbuminaemia (low albumin), which can be seen in nephrotic syndrome (a form of kidney failure), liver failure, protein malabsorption and protein-losing enteropathies. A genetic condition or a side effect from taking sulphonamides (a family of antibiotics) can also cause this appearance. By 2011, only 6 cases of non-hereditary Leukonychia totalis were published.

In familial cases of leukonychia totalis, this condition is caused by mutations in the PLCD1 gene, in chromosome 3p22.2, this mutation shows an autosomal dominant pattern of inheritance, but in some cases, this condition may be autosomal recessive.

Leukonychia partialis

This condition consists of a whitening of parts of the nail plate in the form of small white dots. There are three different variations of partial leukonychia; punctate, transverse and longitudinal leukonychia. Some of the more serious variations of leukonychia partialis may lead to leukonychia totalis.

Leukonychia striata

Leukonychia striata, transverse leukonychia, or Mees' lines are a whitening or discoloration of the nail in bands or "stria" that run parallel to the lunula (nail base). This is commonly caused by physical injury or disruption of the nail matrix. Common examples include excessive biting or tapping of the nails, trauma or injury from accidents involving doors or windows, and extensive use of manicure. It may also occur in great toenails as a result of trauma from footwear. Alternatively, the condition can be caused by heavy metal poisoning, most commonly by lead. Finally, it can be caused by cirrhosis of the liver or chemotherapy.

The tendency toward leukonychia striata is sometimes inherited in an autosomal dominant fashion. In other cases, it can be attributed to vigorous manicuring and trauma aforementioned, or to a wide variety of systemic illnesses. Serious infections known for high fevers, measles, malaria, herpes, and leprosy may also cause this condition. In many patients, there is no obvious cause, and the streaks resolve spontaneously.

There is a similar condition called Muehrcke's lines (apparent leukonychia) which differs from leukonychia in that the lines fade with digital compression and do not migrate with the growth of the nail.

Leukonychia punctata
Also known as "true" leukonychia, this is the most common form of leukonychia, in which small white spots appear on the nails. Picking and biting of the nails are a prominent cause in young children and nail biters. Besides parakeratosis, air that is trapped between the cells may also cause this appearance. It is also caused by trauma. In most cases, when white spots appear on a single or a couple of fingernails or toenails, the most common cause is injury to the base (matrix) of the nail. When this is the case, white spots disappear after around eight months, which is the amount of time the nails take to regrow completely. The pattern and number of spots may change as the nail grows.

Longitudinal leukonychia
Longitudinal leukonychia is far less common and features smaller 1mm white longitudinal lines visible under the nail plate and perpendicular to the nail bed. It may be associated with Darier's disease.

Cause

It is harmless and most commonly caused by minor injuries, such as nail biting, which occur while the nail is growing. Leukonychia occurs most commonly in healthy individuals, and is unrelated to any known nutritional or physiological deficiency. When caused by injury the marks will disappear as the nail grows outwards. While there are various sources that link dietary needs or vitamin deficiency with recurrent leukonychia, this notion has been challenged by some medical researchers.

Other possible reasons for this problem can be linked to:

 Arsenic poisoning
 Lead poisoning
 Pneumonia
 Heart disease
 Kidney failure
 Ill health
 Hypoalbuminemia
 Vitamin deficiency
 Ulcerative colitis
 Liver cirrhosis
 Psychogenic stresses
 Onychophagia
 Trauma injury
 Occupational trauma
 Zinc deficiency
 Protein deficiency
 Psoriasis
 Eczema
Iron deficiency

Diagnosis 
A doctor will take a thorough medical history, and may take blood tests as well as examining liver and kidney function. Intracellular (red blood cell) assays are more sensitive than tests for plasma levels.

Treatment
Improvements have been reported from treating malnutrition associated with zinc deficiency and other minerals.

References

External links 

Conditions of the skin appendages